Leichlingen (officially Leichlingen (Rheinland); Ripuarian: Lëijchlinge) is a town in the Rheinisch-Bergischer Kreis, North Rhine-Westphalia, Germany. Leichlingen is a centre for apple and berry growing in the region.

Geography
Leichlingen is situated at the edge of the Rhine-Ruhr metropolitan region close to Cologne. The town centre lies on the river Wupper.

Twin towns – sister cities

Leichlingen is twinned with:
 Funchal, Portugal
 Henley-on-Thames, England, United Kingdom
 Marly-le-Roi, France

Notable people

Johann Wilhelm Wilms (1772–1847), composer
Friedrich Überweg (1826–1871), philosopher
Hugo Broch (born 1922), World War II flying ace
Wolfgang Zimmermann (born 1949), trade unionist, politician (The Left)
Michael Biegler (born 1961), handball coach

References

Rheinisch-Bergischer Kreis
Districts of the Rhine Province